Resistance is a French television period drama series in six 52-minute episodes, first broadcast (as Résistance) on TF1 in France in May 2014 and on More4 in the UK in August 2015. It was broadcast and streamed on PBS in the US from January 2020.  The mini-series is directed by Miguel Courtois, David Delrieux and Alain Goldman.

Synopsis
The drama is set in German-occupied Paris in 1940 and depicts the lives of students and teachers within the French Resistance in World War II and is loosely based on the activities of the Groupe du musée de l'Homme.

The series, written by Dan Franck, was commissioned to coincide with the 70th anniversary of the liberation of Paris.

The Guardian noted that the series has a "great sense of the sludge and the trudge, and depression and rain, the heartache, and the general constant filthy low-level stress of a long sneaking war in which the most precious – the only – currency was trust, given as grudgingly as you would proffer your soul."

Cast
Pauline Burlet as Lili Franchet
Tom Hudson as Jeannot
Jérémie Petrus as Andre Kirschen
Robert Plagnol as Boris Vildé
Pascale Arbillot as Victoria
Stéphane Debac as Albert Mulveau
Nicolas Koretzky as Morlot
Valérie Karsenti as Maryka
Isabelle Nanty as Paulette
César Domboy as The Kid
Richard Berry as Lili's father
Fanny Ardant as The Countess
Jochen Hägele as Doering
Alexis Michalik as Vélin

References

External links
 Résistance website at TF1
 Resistance website at Channel4
 
 Resistance at PBS

2010s French drama television series
2014 French television series debuts
Television shows set in France
Television shows set in Paris
French Resistance
World War II television drama series
Television series based on actual events
Television series set in 1940